T3 or T-3 may refer to:

Medicine
 T3, in endocrinology, triiodothyronine, a thyroid hormone
 Polar T3 syndrome, characterized by low levels of that hormone in polar explorers
 T3 spinal nerve
 Third thoracic vertebrae

 An electrode site, in the 10–20 EEG system

Vehicles and transportation
 Bankstown Line, a rail service in Sydney, Australia, numbered T3
 Eastern Airways (IATA code)
 Fuji T-3, a Japanese primary military trainer aircraft
 T3, a model of the Oslo Metro OS T1000 train
 Île-de-France tramway Line 3, in Paris 
 Tatra T3, a tramcar
 Trager-Bierens T-3 Alibi, a glider
 T3 transit lane, a type of high-occupancy vehicle lane in Australia
 Volkswagen Type 2 (T3), the third generation of the Volkswagen Transporter van
 T3 tanker, a ship class
 Slingsby T-3A Firefly, a former training aircraft of the United States Air Force
 T3 Road (Zambia), a road in Zambia
 Heathrow Terminal 3

Entertainment
 T3: Alliance, an investigative-public affairs program of TV5 in the Philippines
 T3 (magazine), focusing on new and hi-tech gadgets
 Terminator 3: Rise of the Machines, the third film in the Terminator series
 Tekken 3, a 1997 fighting game in the Tekken franchise

Other uses
 Axiom T3 or T3 space, regular space in topology and related fields of mathematics
 T3, a halogen light bulb form factor
 T3 Technion Technology Transfer, the technology transfer office of the Technion Israel Institute of Technology
 SPARC T3, a CPU introduced by Sun Microsystems in 2010
 Digital Signal 3, or T3 line, a type of telecommunications service
 Fletcher's Ice Island or T-3, an iceberg and scientific research station
 T3 (company), the largest woman-owned advertising agency in the US
 T3 (rapper), founding member of the band Slum Village
 T3 (skyscraper), a skyscraper office building in Taichung, Taiwan
 Tungsten T3, a device in the line of palmOne handhelds
 Tokyo Teleport Town, a planned city on Odaiba, reclaimed land in Tokyo Bay
 T3, a privatisation offering of the company Telstra
 Talking tactile tablet, a touch sensitive device for visually impaired people
 T3, part of the T-carrier telecommunications system, specifying a channel with a bandwidth of 44.736 Mbit/s, capable of carrying 672 voice calls simultaneously
 Canon EOS Rebel T3, a digital camera
 T3, a bedside television unit built by Hospedia
 T-3, the third Jupiter Trojan survey, a subproject of the Palomar–Leiden survey
 T3 (roller coaster) at Kentucky Kingdom
 Sony Xperia T3, an Android smartphone
 A tornado intensity rating on the TORRO scale
 Tikka T3, a series of Finnish bolt-action rifles
 T+3, "trade date plus three days" in financial markets

See also
 3T (disambiguation)
 TTT (disambiguation)